Michael Pavlich is an Australian radio producer and presenter with the Australian Broadcasting Corporation (ABC).

Pavlich first became known as the producer for Trevor Chappell's Overnights program from Monday to Thursday mornings, but increasingly became known as a presenter in his own right due to filling in for Chappell when he was not available. He is commonly nicknamed "Pav" by Chappell and by listeners to the program.

Pavlich is also a musician, is writing a novel, and is related to the Australian rules footballer Matthew Pavlich. He is known to be interested in collecting vintage cereal box toys.

References

ABC radio (Australia) journalists and presenters
Living people
Year of birth missing (living people)